Rakpong Chumuang is a Thai footballer who plays for Thai League 1 club Nongbua Pitchaya as a  right-back.

Honour
Nongbua Pitchaya
 Thai League 2: 2020–21

References

External links

Living people
1992 births
Rakpong Chumuang
Rakpong Chumuang
Rakpong Chumuang
Rakpong Chumuang
Rakpong Chumuang
Rakpong Chumuang
Association football defenders